MV Omskiy-205 is a Russian Omskiy type general cargo ship launched in 1993 by Krasnoyarsk Shipyard. It was damaged while underway during the 2022 Russian invasion of Ukraine, possibly by a Russian mine.

Description 
Omskiy-205 is a  general cargo ship which carries wood and logs. The ship has a single deck and four dry cargo holds, each of which are roughly  large. It has a crew of twelve sailors.

History 
Construction of the ship began in August 1985 under the yard number 255. It was completed in 1993 by Krasnoyarsk Shipyard and given the name Skif. The ship was renamed to Carat in 1999, Berill in 2005, and finally Omskiy-205 in 2006. Over the course of its career, the ship has been owned by the River and Sea Shipping Agency, as well as the Moscow-based companies Marship and VVT Shipping.

March 2022 incident 
On 27 March 2022, Omskiy-205 was in transit from the port of Galluk in Istanbul to Rostov, Russia. Overnight, a distress call was issued while the ship was in the Black Sea,  from Cape Takil near the Kerch Strait. The ship's captain reported that the hull had been breached, the engine room was flooded, and the ship hand lost power and was sinking. A tugboat was sent out and Omskiy-205 was taken under tow around seven hours after the distress call. A rescue boat, the Rescuer Demidov, was also sent which operated three pumps in an attempt to control flooding aboard the ship. None of the 12 crewmen were injured, and Omskiy-205 was taken into port and eventually anchored near the Kerch Bridge off Kavkaz.

Following the incident, Russian media and Russian Maritime Authorities claimed that the hull breach was caused by strong waves and not by military action. However, because of the normal weather conditions and sea state at the time of the breach, it was suggested that Omskiy-205 had struck a friendly breakaway mine laid at the entrance to the Sea of Azov as a part of the 2022 Russian invasion of Ukraine.

References 

Cargo ships of Russia
1993 ships
Ships involved in the 2022 Russian invasion of Ukraine
Maritime incidents in 2022